Thomas Crick,  (17 March 1885 – 13 November 1970) was an Anglican priest in the middle part of the 20th century.

Life
Crick was born in 1885 and educated at St Edmund's School, Canterbury and Brasenose College, Oxford. Ordained in 1909 he began his career with a curacy at Wigan after which he was a Chaplain with the Royal Navy and rose through the service to become Chaplain of the Fleet with the title of Archdeacon of the Royal Navy. An Honorary Chaplain to the King, in 1943 he was appointed Dean of Rochester, a post he held for fifteen years. He died on 13 November 1970. He is now the name of a school house at Kings School Rochester, in Kent. This is called Crick house.

References

1885 births
1970 deaths
People educated at St Edmund's School Canterbury
Alumni of Brasenose College, Oxford
Chaplains of the Fleet
Honorary Chaplains to the King
Deans of Rochester
Companions of the Order of the Bath
Commanders of the Order of the British Empire
Members of the Royal Victorian Order
World War II chaplains
World War I chaplains